Laura Lippman (born January 31, 1959) is an American journalist and author of over 20 detective fiction novels.

Life and career
Lippman was born in Atlanta, Georgia, and raised in Columbia, Maryland. She is the daughter of Theo Lippman, Jr., a writer at the Baltimore Sun, and Madeline Mabry Lippman, a retired school librarian for the Baltimore City Public School System. Her paternal grandfather was Jewish, and the remainder of her ancestry is Scots-Irish. Lippman was raised Presbyterian. She attended high school in Columbia, Maryland, where she was the captain of the Wilde Lake High School It's Academic team. She also participated in several dramatic productions, including Finian's Rainbow, The Lark, and Barefoot in the Park. She graduated from Wilde Lake High School in 1977.

Lippman is a former reporter for the now defunct San Antonio Light and The Baltimore Sun. She is best known for writing a series of novels set in Baltimore and featuring Tess Monaghan, a reporter turned private investigator. Lippman's works have won the Agatha, Anthony, Edgar, Nero, Gumshoe and Shamus awards. What the Dead Know (2007), was the first of her books to make the New York Times Best Seller list, and was shortlisted for the Crime Writer's Association Dagger Award. In addition to the Tess Monaghan novels, Lippman's novel Every Secret Thing was adapted into a 2014 movie starring Diane Lane. Her novel Lady in the Lake, was adapted into a limited series for Apple.

Lippman lives in the South Baltimore neighborhood of Federal Hill and frequently writes in the neighborhood coffee shop Spoons. In addition to writing, she teaches at Goucher College in Towson, Maryland, just outside Baltimore. In January 2007, Lippman taught at the 3rd Annual Writers in Paradise at Eckerd College. In March 2013, she was the guest of honor at Left Coast Crime.

Lippman is married to David Simon, another former Baltimore Sun reporter, and creator and an executive producer of the HBO series The Wire.  The character Bunk is shown to be reading one of her books, In a Strange City, in episode eight of the first season of The Wire. Lippman appeared in a scene in the first episode of the last season of The Wire as a reporter working in the Baltimore Sun newsroom.

Lippman and Simon have a daughter named Georgia Ray Simon, who was born in 2010.

Works

Tess Monaghan series

 Baltimore Blues (1997). 
 Charm City (1997). 
 Butchers Hill (1998). 
 In Big Trouble (1999). 
 The Sugar House (2000). 
 In a Strange City (2001). 
 The Last Place (2002). 
 By A Spider's Thread (2004). 
 No Good Deeds (2006). 
 Another Thing to Fall (2008). 
 The Girl in the Green Raincoat (2011). 
 Hush, Hush (2015). 

Short Stories:
 "Orphans' Court" (1999) (short story in First Cases: Volume 3, edited by Robert J. Randisi)
 "Ropa Vieja" (2001) (short story in Murderers Row, edited by Otto Penzler)
 "The Shoeshine Man's Regrets" (2004) (short story in Murder and All That Jazz, edited by Robert J. Randisi)

Standalone works

Novels
 Every Secret Thing (2004). 
 To The Power of Three (2005). 
 What the Dead Know (2007).  (Little Sister in the UK)
 Life Sentences (2009). 
 I'd Know You Anywhere (2010).  (Don't Look Back in the UK)
 The Most Dangerous Thing (2011). 
 And When She Was Good (2012). 
 After I'm Gone (2014). 
 Wilde Lake (2016). 
 Sunburn (2018). 
 Lady in the Lake (2019). 
 Dream Girl: A Novel (2021).

Short story collections
 Baltimore Noir (2006).  (editor and contributed one story)
 Hardly Knew Her: Stories (2008). 
 Seasonal Work: Stories (2022).

See also

 Tart Noir
 Katy Munger

References

External links
 Interview with Laura Lippman in Shots Ezine, September 2012 (archived)
 Interview with Laura Lippman in Topic magazine, March 2019, Issue 21: Crime
Laura Lippman interview in HuffPost, September 13, 2013: "How Laura Lippman Changed Paths At 42 And Became A Bestselling Author

1959 births
20th-century American non-fiction writers
20th-century American novelists
20th-century American women writers
21st-century American non-fiction writers
21st-century American novelists
21st-century American women writers
Agatha Award winners
American mystery writers
American women journalists
American women novelists
American people of Jewish descent
American people of Scotch-Irish descent
Anthony Award winners
The Baltimore Sun people
Barry Award winners
Edgar Award winners
Goucher College faculty and staff
Living people
Macavity Award winners
Medill School of Journalism alumni
Nero Award winners
Novelists from Georgia (U.S. state)
Novelists from Maryland
People from Columbia, Maryland
Shamus Award winners
Writers from Atlanta
Writers from Baltimore
Women mystery writers
American women academics